Anticles (ancient Greek Αντικλής), from Athens, is listed as a victor in the stadion race of the 110th Olympiad (340 BC). Eusebius of Caesarea refers his name as Anikles, but Diodorus Siculus has Antikles.

References

See also 
 List of Olympic winners of the Stadion race

Ancient Olympic competitors
4th-century BC Athenians